Kamel Taha (born 1897, date of death unknown) was an Egyptian footballer. He competed at the 1920 Summer Olympics and the 1924 Summer Olympics.

References

External links
 

1897 births
Year of death missing
Egyptian footballers
Egypt international footballers
Olympic footballers of Egypt
Footballers at the 1920 Summer Olympics
Footballers at the 1924 Summer Olympics
Place of birth missing
Association football goalkeepers
Al Ahly SC players